Valle de Guadalupe may refer to:

Valle de Guadalupe, Baja California
Valle de Guadalupe, Northern Jalisco
Valle de Guadalupe, Southern Jalisco
Valle de Guadalupe, Michoacán
Valle de Guadalupe, Querétaro